Snake in the Grass may refer to:
 Snake in the Grass (1804 schooner), a schooner launched in 1804
 "Snake in the Grass" (song), a 1969 song by Dave Dee, Dozy, Beaky, Mick & Tich
 Snake in the Grass, a 2002 play by Alan Ayckbourn
 Snake in the Grass (novel), a 1954 novel by Anthony Gilbert
 Snake in the Grass (TV series), an American reality competition series